Bryan Jiménez González (born 22 January 1994) is a Dominican footballer who plays for Lithuanian A Lyga club FC Džiugas Telšiai and the Dominican Republic national team as a right winger or forward. He also holds Spanish citizenship.

Club career
Born in Santo Domingo, Jiménez only started his youth career in 2006, aged 12, and played for Spanish lower sides Grisú CF and CD Los Arcos before joining CD Romanón in the 2012 summer. He scored 25 goals for the latter, and made his senior debuts for Club Siero in the 2013–14 campaign, in the regional leagues.

On 19 July 2014 Jiménez moved to UC Ceares, in Tercera División. After being called up to the national side, he became the club's first international footballer of their 68-year history.

In June 2021 he left FC Džiugas. In A lyga he played in 9 matches and made two assists. And played one match for Džiugas B team in Second League. He got yellow card in 34 minute and was changed in 63 minute.

International career
Jiménez made his international debut for Dominican Republic on 30 August 2014, coming on as a 77th-minute substitute in a 0–2 friendly loss against El Salvador.

References

External links

Bryan Jiménez at LaPreferente.com
Bryan Jiménez at JEP Sports Management

1994 births
Living people
Sportspeople from Santo Domingo
Dominican Republic footballers
Association football wingers
Association football forwards
Association football utility players
FC Džiugas players
Dominican Republic expatriate footballers
Dominican Republic expatriate sportspeople in Lithuania
Expatriate footballers in Lithuania
Dominican Republic international footballers
Dominican Republic emigrants to Spain
Naturalised citizens of Spain
Spanish footballers
UC Ceares players
Tercera División players
Divisiones Regionales de Fútbol players
Spanish expatriate footballers
Spanish expatriate sportspeople in Lithuania
Liga Dominicana de Fútbol players